Knight Foundation may refer to:

 the Philip H. Knight Foundation, established by Phil Knight, Nike, Inc. co-founder, and his wife, Penny Knight
 the Knight Foundation – founded by John S. Knight and James L. Knight, newspaper publishers; based in Miami, Florida
 the Wilton Knight Memorial Foundation for Law and Government, fictional entity from the television series Knight Rider and the television sequel movie Knight Rider 2000